Media Development Investment Fund (MDIF), formerly Media Development Loan Fund, is a New York-registered non-profit 501(c)(3) organization and mission-driven investment fund that provides low-cost financing to independent news and information businesses in challenging environments, mostly in countries with a history of media oppression. As one of the United States-based groups involved in direct media development, it specializes in impact investing and provides affordable debt, equity and quasi-equity financing to help journalists build sustainable businesses around professional, responsible, quality journalism.

In 2016, MDIF was declared an "undesirable" organization by the Office of Prosecutor General of Russia using Russian undesirable organizations law and put on the List of organisations banned in Russia.

Mission and impact 
According to its website “MDIF invests in independent media around the world providing the news, information and debate that people need to build free, thriving societies”.

Its own impact analysis found that more than 120 million people get their news from media supported by MDIF. After five years of working with MDIF, media businesses increase their revenues by an average of 218% and their reach by an average of 187%.

History 
MDIF was founded in 1995 by Saša Vučinić and Stuart Auerbach, the late Washington Post reporter and editor. According to its website, George Soros provided the initial $500,000 funding in 1995 towards what later became MDLF. The organisation was initially established to support media companies in Europe transitioning from communist systems to free markets, but has then expanded to provide financing to media businesses around the world.

Vučinić served as the CEO and Managing Director of MDLF until 31 March 2011, when he stepped down and was succeeded by Harlan Mandel.

In 2013 Media Development Loan Fund changed its name to Media Development Investment Fund. Currently, MDIF funders and investors include a wide range of organizations and individuals who share organisation's commitment to independent media.

In 2016, MDIF was declared an "undesirable" organization by the Office of Prosecutor General of Russia using Russian undesirable organizations law and put on the List of organisations banned in Russia.

Financing 
According to its website, from 1996 to December 31, 2022, MDIF has provided more than $296.3 million in affordable financing, including:
 $251.8 million in loans and equity investments;
 Approximately $43.9 million in technical assistance and other grants;
 Earned over $46.9 million in interest, dividends and capital gains;
 Collected more than $79.1 million in recovered principal invested;
 Approximately $0.6 million through Digital Kiosk, the secure payment service for independent media.

MDIF has invested in 146 clients across 47 countries, writing off 9.9% of the total loaned and invested.
 
MDIF has returned $65.6 million to investors. It ended December 2022 with a portfolio allocated in 60 media businesses across 35 countries.

Other activities 
MDIF is one of the founders of the European Press Prize.

Together with King Baudouin Foundation, Tinius Trust and Mediahuis, MDIF is among European media companies, foundations and impact investors who launched Pluralis, with the aim to support plurality of news across Europe.

In 1998 MDIF also founded CAMP (Centre for Advanced Media-Prague), which provided technology support to independent media in developing countries. In 2010, MDIF spun off CAMP as an independent organization, Sourcefabric, whose mission is to provide independent media outlets with the open source software, tools and support they need to produce the news.

In 2017 MDIF acquired a majority stake in South African media company Mail & Guardian. The restructured ownership saw M&G’s Chief Executive Officer, Hoosain Karjieker, acquire a minority stake in the business as part of a Black Economic Empowerment (BEE) transaction. The former majority shareholder, Trevor Ncube, disposed of his equity interest in M&G.

MDIF report “Media Capture in Europe”  and an op-ed by CEO Harlan Mandel written for the EUObserver that drew attention to problem of media capture in Europe, a situation when governments and business interests collude to control and manipulate the flow of news and information, prompted a reply by Secretary of State for Public Diplomacy and Relations Zoltán Kovács. Harlan Mandel then published a reply to the government’s reply.

References

Non-profit organizations based in New York (state)
International journalism organizations
American journalism organizations